{{Infobox book series|name=ACE Gamebooks|image=Alice's Nightmare in Wonderland.jpg|image_caption=Alice's Nightmare in Wonderland|books={{plainlist|
 Alice's Nightmare in Wonderland
 The Wicked Wizard of Oz
 NEVERLAND - Here Be Monsters! 
 Beowulf Beastslayer
 TWAS - The Krampus Night Before Christmas Dracula - Curse of the Vampire RONIN 47}}|author=Jonathan Green|editors=|title_orig=|translator=|illustrator=Kev Crossley / Russ Nicholson / Tony Hough / Hauke Kock / Neil Googe|cover_artist=Kev Crossley / Russ Nicholson / Tony Hough / Hauke Kock / Neil Googe|country=UK|language=English|discipline=|publisher=Snowbooks|pub_date=2015-|media_type=print|number_of_books=7|list_books=|oclc=|preceded by=|followed by=|website=https://www.facebook.com/ACEgamebooks/}}ACE Gamebooks is a series of gamebooks created by Jonathan Green and published by Snowbooks since 2015. A feature of the titles in the series is that they take classic works of literature and give them a dark twist, often combining steampunk elements. Some of the titles take inspiration from more than one work of classic literature, such as NEVERLAND - Here Be Monsters!, which uses elements of both J. M. Barrie's Peter Pan and Wendy and Sir Arthur Conan Doyle's The Lost World.

Gameplay 
The ACE Gamebooks series are similar in terms of both gameplay and layout to Fighting Fantasy gamebooks, designed to be read by a single player.

The name for the series comes from the initial letters of the three attributes players keep track of throughout the books, Agility, Combat and Endurance. 'ACE' also references the fact that instead of dice, cards can be used to generate random numbers.  Some books in the series introduce other attributes, such as Insanity and Logic, in Alice's Nightmare in Wonderland, and Mutiny in NEVERLAND - Here Be Monsters!

Another feature of the series is that in some of the books the reader can choose which character they want to play as. Each player character has unique content written especially for them, which includes unlockable mini-quests in books such as The Wicked Wizard of Oz.

Combat 
Combat is simulated by rolling dice or picking random playing cards from a standard deck. These randomly-generated numbers are added to the player's, or an opponent's, Combat score to produce a Combat Strength. The Combat Strengths of the player and the opponent are compared, with the higher one winning the Combat Round and deducting Endurance points from the other. Combat in the books also uses an initiative system, with whoever has the initiative gaining a Combat bonus.

Attributes 
 Agility: A measure of how athletic and agile you are.
 Combat: A measure of how skilful you are at fighting, whether it be in hand-to-hand combat, or wielding a keen-edged blade in battle.
 Endurance: A measure of how physically tough you are and how much strength you have left.

Books in the series 
The series consists of seven books so far, with an eighth title (Judgement Day: 1869) due for release in 2023:

A copy of The Wicked Wizard of Oz is on display in the All Things Oz Museum in Chittenango, New York, along with a set of bookmarks produced as rewards for backers of the Kickstarter that was run to fund production of the book.

See also 
 Fighting Fantasy
 Alice's Adventures in Wonderland
 The Wonderful Wizard of Oz
 Peter Pan and Wendy
 The Lost World

References

External links 
 ACE Gamebooks - the official Facebook page
 NEVERLAND - Here Be Monsters! Kickstarter project page
 Alice's Nightmare in Wonderland
The Wicked Wizard of Oz
 Jonathan Green, Author - author Jonathan Green's official website
 Snowbooks.com - the current publisher of the range
 Interview with author Jonathan Green about Alice's Nightmare in Wonderland - Starburst Magazine
 Interview with author Jonathan Green about NEVERLAND - Here Be Monsters! - Starburst Magazine
 Kev Crossley

Gamebooks